Anniara Muñoz Carrazana (born January 24, 1980) is a Cuban volleyball player who competed with the Cuba women's national volleyball team at the 2004 Summer Olympics winning the bronze medal. She also competed at the 2002 FIVB Volleyball Women's World Championship in Germany. On club level she played with Cienfuegos.

Clubs
 Cienfuegos (2002)

References

External links
 

1980 births
Living people
Cuban women's volleyball players
Volleyball players at the 2004 Summer Olympics
Olympic volleyball players of Cuba
Olympic bronze medalists for Cuba
Olympic medalists in volleyball
Volleyball players at the 2003 Pan American Games
Pan American Games silver medalists for Cuba
Medalists at the 2004 Summer Olympics
Pan American Games medalists in volleyball
Medalists at the 2003 Pan American Games